This article is about the 1909 film by the Salvation Army in Australia. For the supporters of the 1638 Scottish National Covenant, see Covenanters

The Scottish Covenanters is a 1909 production made by the Limelight Department of the Salvation Army in Australia.

It was shot in a studio in Caulfield. It was the last production made by Joseph Perry for the Salvation Army.

It was released in New Zealand but not Australia.

References

External links

Australian silent short films
1909 films
Australian black-and-white films
Limelight Department films